ENOC (the Emirates National Oil Company) is a global diversified state owned energy group and operates in oil, gas and coal industry.

History
Established in 1993, ENOC is a wholly owned company of the Government of Dubai, through the Investment Corporation of Dubai. In 1999 ENOC opened its first oil refinery, which produced  and cost about AED 1.5 billion.

In 2019, ENOC presented two new digital ventures under its accelerator program Next, which was launched the same year: Enoc Link, an automotive refueling service and Beema, an online vehicle insurance service.

Operations
ENOC is a multi-interest oil and gas group, and has operations in Dubai and Northern Emirates in UAE, and has recently opened operations in Abu Dhabi, the largest of the emirates. One of its subsidiaries, ENOC Processing Company LCC (EPCL) runs the Jebel Ali refinery in Dubai.

The ENOC Group comprises numerous related subsidiaries, across two main categories - energy operations and general services - covering upstream, midstream, and downstream sectors.

In June 2015, ENOC acquired the remaining 46% of Dragon Oil for £3.7 billion pound sterling.

Overview of personnel
The board of members consists of Sheikh Hamdan Bin Rashid Al Maktoum, Saeed Mohammed Al Tayer and Ahmad Sharaf. The group's current CEO is Saif Humaid Al Falasi. Mohammad Sharf serves as the group's CFO.

Awards 
In 2018, the group was awarded a Transform Award MENA Bronze.

In 2020, ENOC Group won the Dubai Gold Award for Quality, which honors the outstanding performance of organizations, during a virtual ceremony held on November 11, 2020.

See also

Abu Dhabi National Oil Company (ADNOC)

References

...

Oil and gas companies of the United Arab Emirates
Government-owned companies of the United Arab Emirates
UAE
Non-renewable resource companies established in 1993
Emirati companies established in 1993